Lancashire is a county in North West England.  In 1974 parts of the historic county were divided between Greater Manchester, Merseyside, Cheshire and Cumbria, and part of the West Riding of Yorkshire was transferred into the county, creating the non-metropolitan county of Lancashire.  Together with the unitary authorities of Blackburn with Darwen and Blackpool it now forms the ceremonial county of Lancashire.

Buildings in England are given listed building status by the Secretary of State for Culture, Media and Sport, acting on the recommendation of English Heritage.  Listed status gives the structure national recognition and protection against alteration or demolition without authorisation.  Grade I listed buildings are defined as being of "exceptional interest, sometimes considered to be internationally important"; only 2.5 per cent of listed buildings are included in this grade. This is a complete list of Grade I listed churches and chapels in the ceremonial county of Lancashire as recorded in the National Heritage List for England.

Christian churches have existed in Lancashire since Anglo-Saxon times.  Architectural features from that era have survived in St Peter's Church, and in St Patrick's Chapel, both in Heysham; churches such as St Margaret, Hornby, contain Anglo-Saxon fragments in the form of parts of crosses or carved stones.  Norman features are found in some of the churches, including St John the Evangelist, Gressingham, and St Saviour, Stydd, but almost all those in the list are Gothic in style.  Many were restored during the 19th century and have additions or alterations in Gothic Revival style, including St Bartholomew, Colne, and St Cuthbert, Halsall.  All but two of the churches are Anglican by denomination. The two Roman Catholic churches in the list date from the 19th century and are in the Gothic Revival style: Pleasington Priory, and St Walburge, Preston.  Most of the county is rural, but remnants of a greater industrial past remain in the larger towns of Preston and Blackburn, and in the smaller former textile towns of east Lancashire.  Lancashire's  bedrock is mainly sandstone, with limestone deposits in the north and in the area around Clitheroe, which provided the major building materials for the churches.

Churches

References

Bibliography

 
Lancashire
 
 Churches
Lancashire churches